The Ann Arbor Challenger is a professional tennis tournament played on indoor hard courts. It is currently part of the ATP Challenger Tour. It is held annually in Ann Arbor, Michigan, United States since 2020.

Past finals

Singles

Doubles

References

ATP Challenger Tour